Five scattered tornadoes touched down across the Great Plains and Midwestern United States on June 19, 1951. The event was highlighted by a large, violent F4 tornado family that moved through the western and northern suburbs of Minneapolis, causing all the tornadic casualties from the outbreak. In all, one person was killed, 20 others were injured, and damage was estimated at $ ( USD). There was one additional death and six injuries from non-tornadic events as well.

Meteorological synopsis
A low-pressure area formed over northeastern South Dakota very early on June 19. As other storms formed across the Central U.S. throughout the day, this low moved slowly eastward into Minnesota, becoming the focal point for locally strong to severe storms, including two that would produce a violent F4 tornado family and a strong F2 tornado.

Confirmed tornadoes

Note: Several tornadoes were reported in the CDNS report but not confirmed in the final count:
However, this may have actually been the tornado confirmed on the day instead of the Comanche County, Kansas, F0 tornado. High winds flattened nearly ripe wheat, while hail caused extensive damage to crops and light damage to property.

June 19 event

Hutchinson–Hamel–Brooklyn Center–Spring Lake Park, Minnesota

This violent F4 tornado family, which was accompanied by heavy rain and large hail, was first observed touching down in McLeod County west of Hutchinson. A car in this area was picked up, thrown , and totaled. The occupants in the car, a police chief and his son, escaped without any injuries. The tornado then moved directly through Hutchinson at around 5:30 pm CT. An icehouse, warehouse, houses, barns and outbuildings were obliterated, and about 50 city dwellings, buildings, and street carnival concessions were damaged. Additionally, many windows were blown in or broken; chimneys, billboards, signs, and power and communication lines were blown down; cars and growing crops were damaged or destroyed; and hundreds of trees were uprooted. Two homes sustained low-end F3 damage and debris from the town was strewn along MN 7. Most of the town was left without power after the storm as well. The tornado then moved northeastward, heavily damaging several farms north of Silver Lake, possibly lifting before reaching Wright County.

Heavy rain and hail continued with the storm before the tornado touched down again in Hennepin County at around 6:30 pm CT. As it reached the highway, it threw a home  before leveling it, severely injuring the elderly woman in the house. She would later die at the hospital; her nephew and foster daughter were also injured. The tornado also heavily damaged or destroyed other homes, a garage, and several other structures. The tornado then weakened, doing less severe damage, before restrengthening to an intense F3 tornado as it struck Brooklyn Center at around 7 pm CT. A trailer house was picked and thrown three blocks before being destroyed. Seven homes were also destroyed and clocks were stopped at 7:01 pm as the power went out. A boy was injured in the town as well. The tornado then crossed over into Anoka County northwest of Spring Lake Park, where more damage and destruction occurred and clocks were stopped at 7:03 pm CT. After either briefly weakening or possibly lifting, the tornado demolished several homes near the intersection of Foley Boulevard and US 10 (now County Road 10). Nine people, including seven children, were injured in one of the homes. The tornado then finally weakened before dissipating shortly thereafter. Across this portion of the path, the tornado damaged or destroyed 50 homes as well as many other buildings.

The tornado family caused $5 million in damage killed one person and injured 20 others. The same storm also produced a tornado report east of St. Paul at around 7:45 pm CT, but that turned out to be a just a well-developed funnel cloud that never touched the ground.

Non-tornadic impacts
Six cottages, boat buildings, and one farmstead were damaged by wind and hail in Brown's Lake and nearby Salix, Iowa, injuring two people. A small tornado was also reported in Brown's Lake, but it was not confirmed. A line of storms also bought wind and hail from Elliott to Morton Mills, severely damaging a barn and a house with minor damage to numerous other buildings, including extensive breakage of glass by hail. Electric service was also disrupted, and one person was injured. Another tornado was also reported near Elliott, but the event was not deemed to have not been the cause of the damage in the town. In McCallsburg, golf ball-size hail inflicted severe damage throughout the town. 387 window panes of glass were shattered at the McCallsburg consolidated school, and all the businesses south of Main Street had shattered windows. The Bethany Lutheran church, which was still under construction at the time, had 41 window panes shattered. Many roofs had holes in them, which allowed heavy rain to go through them and cause more damage.

The hail became even larger as the storm moved eastward away from McCallsburg and struck St. Anthony and Clemons. Described as being the size of oranges, the hail left baseball-size holes in numerous roofs in both towns. Considerable damage was also reported at Garwin, Toledo, Tama, Vining, Elberon, and Keystone. An 82-year-old man died due to overexertion in the storm. Three more injuries also occurred: a man was severely burned by an electric line, and a woman and her child were hospitalized after being braised by hail. There was considerable damage to farm buildings, while minor damage was caused by falling trees all along the track of the storm. Hail damage was mainly to growing crops, but broken glass was also an issue in several towns. There was also mainly public utility line damage in Belle Plaine and Cedar Rapids.

There was also sporadic hail and wind damage in parts of Oklahoma and Kansas, as well as Bloomfield, Montana. This included Ellis County, Oklahoma, where hail was reportedly as much as a foot deep, while winds damaged a church in Arnett, Oklahoma.

See also
List of North American tornadoes and tornado outbreaks
List of F4 and EF4 tornadoes

Notes

References

Sources

Tornadoes of 1951
F4 tornadoes
Tornadoes in Iowa
Tornadoes in Minnesota
Tornadoes in Nebraska
Tornadoes in Kansas
Tornadoes in Wisconsin